Dal is a surname, a masculine given name and a nickname. Notable people with the name include:

Given name
 Dal Bahadur (fl. 2017), Indian politician
 Dal Collins (1907–2001), South African cricket umpire
 Dal Bahadur Gurung (1922–1992), Nepalese person mistaken for an imaginary character
 Dal Joon Lee (1939–2010), American table tennis player
 Dal Mardan Shah (r. 1764-1765), king of the Malla state of Patan in Nepal
 Dal Millington Lemmon (1887–1958), American judge
 Dal Bahadur Rana (fl. from 2008), Nepalese politician
 Dal Shealy (born 1938), American football player
 Dal Singh (politician) (1915–1991), Indian politician
 Dal Bahadur Sunar (born 1959), Nepalese politician
 Dal Singh Thapa, a leader of Nepali Congress imprisoned for a 1961 assassination attempt

Nickname
 Dal Dozzi (1936–2012), Australian rules footballer Adelio Paul Dozzi
 Dal Maxvill (born 1939), American baseball player Charles Dallan Maxvill
 Dal Stivens (1911–1997), Australian writer Dallas George Stivens

Surname
Nedim Dal (Edin Delić, born 1975), Bosnian-born Turkish basketball player
Oleg Dal (1941–1981), Soviet actor
Vladimir Dal (1801–1872), Russian lexicographer

Masculine given names
Turkish-language surnames